Mais Forte que a Paixão is Adelaide Ferreira's fifth album.

Track listing
 Sem Saber a Razão (Without knowing the reason)
 Pus a Alma nos Teus Dentes (Put the soul in your teeth)
 Há quanto tempo (Eu Espero) (How long (I wait))
 Interlúdio 1 (Interlude 1)
 Foi ontem à Noite (Was yesterday at night)
 Bar Paraíso (Paradise bar)
 Interlúdio 2 (Interlude 2)
 Diz um Segredo (Says a secret)
 Quero Estar onde Tu Estás (I want to be where you are)
 Interlúdio 3 (Interlude 3)
 Mais Forte que a Paixão (Stronger than the passion)
 Cantar para Ti (Sing for you)
 Há tanto para Aprender (There's so much to learn)

2006 albums
Adelaide Ferreira albums